Bleptochiton leucotrigona is a moth in the family Depressariidae, and the only species in the genus Bleptochiton. It was described by Turner in 1947. It is found in Australia, where it has been recorded from Queensland.

The wingspan is 24–26 mm.

References

Moths described in 1947
Depressariinae